Sergiu Marian Radu (born 10 August 1977 in Râmnicu Vâlcea, Vâlcea County, Socialist Republic of Romania) is a former Romanian professional footballer who played as forward in Romania, France, and Germany at top tier level. He had also earned one caption for the Romania national football team in 2007 in a match against Belarus.

Career 
Born in Râmnicu Vâlcea in Vâlcea County in 1977, Radu began his career in his native Romania. He started out at Jiul Petroşani, before leaving in 1998 for Bucharest champions Rapid Bucharest. He subsequently moved to Bucharest rivals FC Naţional three years later.

2003 brought his first move to a foreign club, Le Mans UC72 in France.  However this was not a successful period, and after fifteen goalless matches he returned to Naţional. He moved to Germany in 2005 to join Energie Cottbus, then a 2. Bundesliga club. Cottbus won promotion in 2006, with Radu's contribution being 12 goals in 33 games. In the next season with Cottbus in the Bundesliga he scored 14 goals in 34 matches, being the goal-scorer of his team.

In July 2007, he made a permanent move to VfL Wolfsburg and now in January 2008 he was loaned to VfB Stuttgart who did not use the option to sign the forward permanently.

For the 2008–09 campaign, Radu moved on a loan spell to newly promoted Bundesliga side 1. FC Köln. After being demoted to the VfL Wolfsburg reserve team on 30 May 2009 he returned to Energie Cottbus on 17 July 2009 signing a three-year contract.

In January 2011, he ended his contract with Cottbus and joined Alemannia Aachen. Radu scored on his debut in the 4–2 win against Karlsruher SC in the 19th round of the 2. Bundesliga.

Honours

Club
Rapid Bucharest
 Liga I: 1998–99
 Supercupa României: 1999

References

External links
 

1977 births
Living people
Romanian footballers
Romania international footballers
Association football forwards
Liga I players
CSM Jiul Petroșani players
FC Olimpia Satu Mare players
FC Rapid București players
FC Progresul București players
Ligue 1 players
Le Mans FC players
Bundesliga players
2. Bundesliga players
FC Energie Cottbus players
VfL Wolfsburg players
VfB Stuttgart players
1. FC Köln players
Alemannia Aachen players
Expatriate footballers in France
Expatriate footballers in Germany
Romanian expatriate sportspeople in Germany
Romanian expatriate footballers
Sportspeople from Râmnicu Vâlcea